Sadanaga (written: 貞永) is a Japanese surname. Notable people with the surname include:

, Japanese long-distance runner

Sadanaga (written: 貞長) is also a masculine Japanese given name. Notable people with the name include:

, Japanese daimyō

Japanese-language surnames
Japanese masculine given names